Somadeva Bhatta was an 11th century writer from Kashmir, and author of the Kathasaritsagara.

Not much is known about him except that his father's name was Rama and he composed his work (probably during the years 1063–1081 CE) for the entertainment of Queen Suryamati, a princess of Jalandhara and wife of King Ananta of Kashmir. The queen was quite distraught as it was a time when the political situation in Kashmir was 'one of discontent, intrigue, bloodshed and despair'.

He was a Shaivite Hindu Brahmin, and very respectful of Buddhism and some of the tales in the Kathasaritsagara show Buddhist influences. It is also known as the encyclopaedia of social life in the 11th century.

References
 The Katha Sarit Sagara, or Ocean of the Streams of Story, Translated by  C.H.Tawney, 1880

External links
 
 	 	
 	
 
 

11th-century Indian poets
Collectors of fairy tales
Kashmiri Brahmins
Kashmiri Shaivites